Innovation is the practical implementation of new ideas, or of improved goods or services.

Innovation may also refer to:

Arts, entertainment, and media

Music
 Innovation (album), a 2010 album by Pink Lady
 Innovations (album), a 1985 album by El Gran Combo de Puerto Rico

Periodicals
 Innovation (magazine), a magazine compiling recent developments in the area of research in Singapore and globally
 Innovation (journal), sociological academic journal about management, innovation and sustainability.
 Innovations (journal), an academic journal about entrepreneurial solutions to global challenges

Other uses in arts, entertainment, and media
 Innovation (TV program), a 1984–2004 American television program focusing on innovation that aired on PBS
 Innovation Comics, a Wheeling, West Virginia-based comic book company active in the late 1980s and early 1990s

Brands and enterprises
 Innovative Communications Corporation, a telecommunications company in the United States Virgin Islands
 Innovative Interfaces, a library-software company
 L'Innovation Department Store, a former Belgian department store chain, known for the disastrous 1967 L'Innovation Department Store fire
 NPO Novator (Russian for innovator), a Russian company that designs long-range anti-aircraft missiles

Business terms and technology management
 Disruptive innovation
 Eco-innovation
 Financial innovation, a term used in some discourses on economy
 Induced innovation
 Innovation indices
 Innovation leadership
 Innovation management
 Innovation system
 Open innovation
 Outcome-Driven Innovation
 Pace of innovation
 Product innovation
 Pro-innovation bias
 Technological innovation system

Organizations and projects
 Radical Innovation Project at Rensselaer Polytechnic Institute
 UNDP Innovation Facility, established by the  United Nations Development Programme in 2014

Science and technology
 Innovation (biology), a change from an ancestor
 Innovation (signal processing) a concept in statistical signal processing

Other uses
 Bid‘ah, any type of innovation in Islam
 Open Innovations (event), an annual forum and technology show that focuses on new technologies and perspectives of the international cooperation on innovations

See also 
 Innovators (disambiguation)